Nils Diederich (born 6 May 1934) is a German Social Democratic Party politician and political scientist. He served as a member of the German Bundestag from 1976 to 1987 and 1989 to 1994. He is professor emeritus for political science, focusing on political sociology, at the Free University of Berlin.
He has a diplom in economics and joined the SPD in 1952. In the Bundestag, he was a member of the finance and budget committees.

References 

1934 births
Living people
Members of the Bundestag for the Social Democratic Party of Germany
Members of the Bundestag 1976–1980
Members of the Bundestag 1980–1983
Members of the Bundestag 1983–1987
Members of the Bundestag 1987–1990
Members of the Bundestag 1990–1994
German political scientists
20th-century German politicians
Political sociologists
Academic staff of the Free University of Berlin